The Bangladesh Institute of Bank Management (BIBM) is the national training, research, consultancy and education institute on banking and finance collectively owned by all banks that are in operation in the country.

About BIBM 
Bangladesh Institute of Bank Management was established in 1974 to train officials of banks and financial institutions of Bangladesh. Since then, BIBM has extended its scope to include providing Masters in Bank Management (MBM) and Evening MBM (EMBM) degrees, carrying out research in banking and finance, holding seminars and round table discussions, and aiding financial institutions in their recruitment. Even with these activities, which are somewhat complementary with one another, training still occupies the centre-stage of BIBM operation. But BIBM now imparts training to only mid-level and senior officials of banks and financial institutions and generally in areas where all its members have common interest.

Governing board

Chairman
Governor, Bangladesh Bank

Members
 Deputy governors, Bangladesh Bank
 Managing director & CEO, Sonali Bank Limited
 Managing director & CEO, Janata Bank Limited
 Managing director & CEO, Agrani Bank Limited
 Managing director & CEO, Rupali Bank Limited
 Managing director & CEO, Pubali Bank Limited
 Managing director, Uttara Bank Limited
 Managing director, Bangladesh Krishi Bank
 Managing director, Bangladesh Development Bank Limited
 President & managing director, AB Bank Limited
 Managing director, National Bank Limited
 Managing director & CEO, Eastern Bank Limited
 Managing director, United Commercial Bank Limited
 Managing director, Islami Bank Bangladesh Limited
 Managing director, IFIC Bank Limited
 Managing director, Rajshahi Krishi Unnayan Bank
 CEO, Standard Chartered Bank
 Managing director, Dutch-Bangla Bank Limited
 Managing director & CEO, Mercantile Bank Limited
 Managing director, ONE Bank Limited
 Managing director, Al-Arafah Islami Bank Limited
 Managing director & CEO, National Credit and Commerce Bank Limited
 Managing director & CEO, Trust Bank Limited
 Managing director, Southeast Bank Limited
 Managing director, Social Islami Bank Limited
 CEO, The Hongkong and Shanghai Banking Corporation Limited
 Managing director, Standard Bank Limited
 Managing director & CEO, Export Import Bank of Bangladesh Limited
 Managing director & CEO, Mutual Trust Bank Limited
 Managing director, BASIC Bank Limited
 Managing director, Jamuna Bank Limited
 President & managing director, Bank Asia Limited
 Managing director, First Security Islami Bank Limited
 Managing director & CEO, Meghna Bank Limited
 Managing director, South Bangla Agriculture and Commerce Bank Limited
 Managing director & CEO, NRB Commercial Bank Limited
 Country director, WOORI Bank Limited

Publications 
The institute publishes a quarterly journal named Bank Parikrama. The main objective of the journal is to publish articles, notes, comments, etc. in the fields of banking, finance, economics and allied subjects. Submitted articles and notes are published based on the review report given by the experts of the relevant field. The journal has been progressively getting popularity over the years. The journal is available with Tk. 50.00 for the inland readers and with US$2.00 for foreign readers.

Bank Parikrama, a journal of banking & finance, is a quarterly journal of the Bangladesh Institute of Bank Management (BIBM) published in March, June, September and December each year.

References

External links
 Location In Google Map 
 Official website of BIBM
 Official website of MBM Alumni Association
 FaceBook Page on MBM Alumni Association
 BIBM Governing Board 

Banking in Bangladesh
Professional associations based in Bangladesh
Banking schools